Limerick Football Club was an association football club based in Limerick, Ireland who played in the League of Ireland and currently have teams competing in the underage National League of Ireland.

The first Limerick Football Club was founded in 1937 and has had a number of guises through its history, known at different times as Limerick, Limerick United, Limerick City and Limerick 37. Each manifestation of the club has been the sole representative of senior football in Limerick city since 1937.

Limerick won the League of Ireland title twice, in the 1959–60 and 1979–80 seasons, and the FAI Cup twice, in 1971 and 1982. They also won the League of Ireland Cup three times, 1975–76, 1992–93 and 2001–02. The club competed in European competitions on six occasions.

History

Foundation and early years
Limerick got its first taste of senior soccer in the early 1930s when the Limerick District Management Committee (LDMC) arranged a number of friendly matches between senior clubs such as Waterford United and Bray and a local junior selection. The success of these fixtures prompted the LDMC to form a senior side and attempt to gain entry to the Free State League. Their application was accepted in June 1937 and a Limerick senior team replaced Dolphin who had withdrawn from the league. On 19 July 1937, a new, private company, Limerick Association Football and Sports Co. Ltd, was registered.

On 22 August 1937, Limerick played its first match. It was against Shamrock Rovers in the Dublin City Cup, a prominent competition that ran from the 1930s to the 1970s, and won 1–0. They ended the 1937–38 season in 10th place out of 12 teams, but managed to capture their first trophy when they beat Cork United 1–0 in the replayed final of the Munster Senior Cup at the Markets Field. During those early seasons, Limerick lined out in red-and-white striped jerseys and white shorts. When Waterford resigned from the league in 1941, the club purchased their blue jerseys and would wear blue and white for the next 40 years.

The 1940s saw Limerick make some big improvements on the playing field and they were twice runners-up in the League of Ireland (1943–44 and 1944–45), were beaten in two FAI Cup semi-finals (1942–43 and 1946–47) and were runners-up in the League of Ireland Shield in 1945–46. The latter was the forerunner of the League Cup, the third most important competition after the League and the FAI Cup. They won the Munster Senior Cup again in 1948–49. It was not until the 1950s that Limerick captured their first national title when they won the Shield in 1953. They added to this when they captured the Dublin City Cup in 1958–59, beating Drumcondra in the final.

League of Ireland champions and FAI Cup winners
Limerick captured their first League of Ireland championship in the 1959–60 season under the management of Limerick man Sonny Price, who had played for Limerick, Waterford and Glentoran. Although they lost their last match 3–2 to St. Patrick's Athletic on Sunday, 17 April 1960, they still managed to win the league by two points from Cork Celtic. Unlike other years, when the majority of the sides were local, this team had a nucleus of Dublin-based players who supplied six to the panel, with five from Limerick, two from Cork and the remainder from junior circles.

The Limerick board decided they wanted to develop an all-local team and so they brought in Ewan Fenton, then aged 29, from Wrexham to implement their plan, starting for the 1960–61 season. He was an immediate hit with staff, players and fans and his quiet and undemonstrative personality ensured he became very popular. He also helped build on the success that Sonny Price had gained with the team and introduced a great number of talented local players to League of Ireland football.

Limerick lost FAI Cup finals in 1965 and again in 1966 to Shamrock Rovers before they finally captured the title in 1971, beating Drogheda United 3–0 in a replay. That team included Andy McEvoy, Richie Hall, Kevin Fitzpatrick, Al Finucane, Dave Barrett, Sean Byrnes, Tony Meaney, Joe O’Mahony, Hughie Hamilton and Paddy Shortt. Fenton also advanced the careers of other notable Limerick players such as Dessie McNamara, Gerry McCarthy, Mick Doyle, Dick O’Connor, Johnny Walsh, Pat Nolan and Ger Duggan. Limerick had captured a further two Dublin City Cups under Fenton, in 1967 and 1970.

Ewan Fenton left Limerick in 1967 to talk up the managerial position with Linfield, and enjoyed considerable success with that club, winning seven titles in three years. The early 1970s saw some turbulent financial times for Limerick coupled with diminishing fortunes on the field. Fenton returned as manager for the 1975–76 season and introduced a number of young players, without much success in the league, but won the League Cup that season, beating Sligo Rovers 4–0 in the final. Frankie Johnson took over as manager for the 1976–77 season and Limerick were beaten 2–0 by Dundalk in the FAI Cup Final, but this was again coupled with a poor league performance.

Eoin Hand arrived as player-manager from Portsmouth for the 1979–80 season and guided the club to its second League of Ireland Championship. Tony Meaney scored a penalty in the ultimate game, a 1–1 draw against Athlone Town, to finish one point ahead of Dundalk. Hand was still in charge when Limerick won the FAI Cup again in 1982, defeating Bohemians in the final at Dalymount Park. This marked Kevin Fitzpatrick's final game in goal after 22 seasons.

Limerick City
The club had changed its name to Limerick United in 1977 and won a League of Ireland championship and FAI Cup under this name. Affairs at the club began to deteriorate after the FAI Cup win in 1982 and the beginning of the 1983–84 season saw High Court action with a battle for ownership of the Limerick senior soccer club. Soccer in the city was suspended for eight weeks pending a decision, which went in favour of Pat Grace, who had the Irish franchise for Kentucky Fried Chicken. Grace changed the name of the club to Limerick City and also changed the colours from blue and white to yellow and green. Limerick City won the revived League of Ireland Shield and the Munster Senior Cup in its first season. The Shield was won in the last game played at the Markets Field on 22 April 1984. They moved out of the Market's Field to a new home in Rathbane for the start of the 1984–85 season. This move proved ultimately to be unpopular with the fans and heralded a decline in the club's fortunes. The 1985–86 season saw the League of Ireland being divided into two divisions for the first time – the Premier Division and First Division, with Limerick in the Premier Division.

Billy Hamilton was brought in as player manager in 1987. Hamilton had enjoyed considerable success as a player at Burnley and Oxford United and played in two World Cup finals with Northern Ireland. He stayed at Limerick for two seasons, guiding the club to a third-place finish in the League in his second season in charge. However, the only trophy won during that period was the Munster Senior Cup in 1988. He resigned in September 1989 and Pat Grace followed soon after. The club changed its name back to Limerick FC, the colours back to blue and white and Fr Joe Young became the new chairman.

1990 to 2005
Limerick were relegated for the first time in 1990–91, a year which also saw them lose a League Cup Final to Derry City. Sam Allardyce was appointed as player manager for the 1991–92 season and immediately brought the club back to the top flight. Allardyce only remained for one season, scoring three times in 23 appearances, before departing to take up a coaching role at Preston North End. Limerick finished a respectable sixth in the Premier Division the following season and also won the League Cup, beating St Patrick's Athletic in the final. Relegation was to follow the next season and a long period of mediocrity and disappointment was to follow.

Financial problems plagued the club and they had to rely on the goodwill of a local junior side, Pike Rovers, for a home ground for the 2000–01 season. Fr Joe Young departed as chairman and the new chairman, Danny Drew, took the club back to Rathbane in an attempt to revive their fortunes. The 2001–02 season saw another League Cup victory, this time over Derry City in the final, but no improvement in the league followed over the coming seasons.

Limerick 37
The necessity for a new League of Ireland franchise in Limerick first became apparent in December 2006, when the FAI Club Licensing Appeal Board rejected Limerick FC's appeal against its prior failure to attain the UEFA licence necessary for admission to the League of Ireland's First Division for the 2007 season.

The FAI's decision effectively disenfranchised the incumbent Limerick FC and its chairman Danny Drew, although the organisation remained receptive to the continued participation of Limerick within senior football. To this end, FAI chief executive John Delaney openly solicited approaches from other interested parties within the city of Limerick even as he announced the rejection of Limerick FC's appeal: "We want a healthy Limerick based club in the new Eircom League of Ireland and if interested entities seek a licence, we would assess them carefully for their suitability to meet the criteria required to play in the league."
On 3 January 2007, the FAI confirmed that its appeal for Limerick-based applicants to the league had garnered interest from a number of parties, one of which identified itself as Soccer Limerick, a consortium purporting to represent the entire spectrum of Limerick football, from schoolboy to Junior (amateur) level, and operating under the auspices of the Limerick Sports Partnership.

Eight days later, Soccer Limerick confirmed that its constituent committees had approved the submission of a formal application for a UEFA club licence, with a view to gaining entry to the First Division of the National League for the 2007 season, with a team called Limerick 37, named after the year that the original club was founded. Soccer Limerick spokesman Ger Finnan confirmed that Limerick 37 planned to stage home fixtures at Jackman Park, headquarters of the LDMC, and would announce the appointment of a first-team manager on Monday 15 January 2007. Paul McGee was subsequently appointed manager of Limerick 37, and signed 11 players before the start of the season.

With McGee's results and style of play not going down well with the home fans, the club opted to replace him with former player and manager Mike Kerley, who brought about mid-table respectability, as well as an end of season run which saw Limerick end Waterford's promotion hopes with a 5–1 win in Limerick, a 1–0 away defeat of eventual division winners Dundalk and a 1–1 draw away to Shelbourne, with Colin Scanlan's late equaliser denying Shelbourne the title and promotion in the 2008 season.

However, just weeks before the start of the 2009 season, Kerley and the club unexpectedly parted ways, and following a brief and unsuccessful stop-gap solution of a three-man management team, Limerick moved to appoint Pat Scully.

Limerick F.C.
The name of the club was changed back to Limerick F.C. for the start of the 2009 season. By mid-2009, the club was in serious financial difficulty. A Limerick businessman, Pat O'Sullivan, made a significant donation to the club that July. He joined the board as chairman in August 2009 and became the owner in February 2010. Among his stated objectives were to stabilise the finances of the club and to build strong community links such as community based club programmes and youth development programmes.

Under manager Pat Scully, Limerick finally ended their long stay in the First Division, winning promotion to the Premier Division at the end of the 2012 season. Scully left the club at the end of the season and Stuart Taylor was brought in as manager. With a number of signings from both the UK and Europe, Limerick enjoyed a comfortable first season back in the Premier Division. The following season, however, Taylor was fired due to the club's poor form, and Martin Russell was appointed as his replacement. Russell steadied the ship and the club avoided relegation in 2014. However, in 2015, the club were relegated. A terrible start to the season saw Limerick stranded at the bottom after failing to win any of the first 21 games, and despite an incredible run of form which saw Limerick avoid automatic relegation, they were demoted after losing 2–1 on aggregate to Finn Harps in a playoff.

The following season, with a squad of full-time professionals in a division of part-time teams, was little more than a procession for Limerick as they cruised to the 2016 First Division title. They won their first 12 games to open up a huge points lead and only lost one match all season, winning the division with 6 games to spare. They also beat two Premier Division teams along the way to a place in the final of the League Cup, but lost 4–1 to St. Patricks Athletic.

After a poor start to the 2017 Premier Division, Martin Russell left his position and was temporarily replaced by Willie Boland, who had been manager of underage teams. Limerick secured a permanent replacement with the appointment of Neil McDonald, and the club finished the season in 7th place, as well as advancing to the FAI Cup semi-final for the first time in many years. In January, McDonald left the club in January 2018 to take up a position at Scunthorpe United and was replaced by Tommy Barrett, while Pat O'Sullivan announced his intention to sell his stake in the club.

Treaty United

In December 2019, Limerick FC were on the verge of extinction after the examinership process to try to keep their trading company afloat ended unsuccessfully. The club had debts of approximately €490,000 and did not receive a League of Ireland licence for the 2020 season. A new entity, named Limerick United, were granted a League of Ireland First Division license in January 2020. However, they were forced to change the name to Treaty United before the season started. In February 2020, Treaty United withdrew applications to join the League of Ireland underage structures for the 2020 season. Treaty entered the league for the first time ahead of the 2021 League of Ireland First Division season.

Stadiums
Limerick FC has used a number of venues around the city as their home ground over the years, including Markets Field in Garryowen, Jackman Park on Carey's Road, Hogan Park in Rathbane, Thomond Park and Pike Rovers ground at Crossagalla. The Markets Field has always been considered to be the spiritual home of football in the city as the club enjoyed considerable success at the venue and moving from there to Hogan Park heralded a serious decline in the club's fortunes. Up until 2012, and Limerick progress into the Premier Division the club was using Jackman Park, which belongs to the Limerick District League (LDMC), for home games. It has a training base at Knocklisheen, on the north side of the city. For the beginning of the new 2013 season, it was announced that Thomond Park would play host to Limerick FC's home games for the coming seasons with some sources estimating it would be 2015 before Limerick would get to return to the Markets Field

In March 2011 it was announced that the Markets Field had been purchased by the Limerick Enterprise Development Partnership (LEDP) with a charitable donation from the JP McManus Charitable Foundation, with a view towards Limerick FC returning to the venue sometime during 2012. The club has plans to develop the site into an 8,000 capacity, all-seated stadium.
On promotion to the Airtricity League of Ireland Premier Division for the 2013 Season, Limerick moved to 26,500 capacity stadium Thomond Park for their home games. The club returned to the Markets Field on Friday 5 June 2015 for the first time in 31 years, losing 1–2 to Drogheda United in the League of Ireland Premier Division.

European record
Limerick appeared in European competitions on six occasions in its history. In 12 matches they scored seven goals and while the club never won a European game, it drew twice. One of those draws was achieved at The Dell against a Southampton team that included former European Footballer of the Year Kevin Keegan and Mick Channon. In the home fixture famous rugby international Tony Ward gave Yugoslav international defender Ivan Golac a roasting.

Limerick first competed in 1960 in the European Cup against Young Boys, but suffered their heaviest aggregate defeat. Limerick moved their 1965 Cup Winners' Cup home leg to Dalymount Park – one of only two 'home' games played outside of Limerick. Pat Nolan is the only player ever to have scored for Limerick in Limerick in a European game.

The most famous European game was the 'home' match against Real Madrid in the European Cup in 1980. Because of concerns over crowd control at both The Markets Field and Thomond Park, the match was played at Lansdowne Road in Dublin. Although a crowd of up to 30,000 was expected, Dublin football fans stayed away en masse and only 6,500 people saw a Limerick team, under Eoin Hand, almost beat the aristocrats of European football. A number of controversial refereeing decisions, including a disallowed Johnny Matthews goal and a dubious penalty award, went against Limerick and they were beaten by 2–1. Des Kennedy scored twice in the tie, one at home and one in the 5–1 away defeat, in front of a crowd of 60,000 in Madrid.

Overview

Matches

Honours

 League of Ireland: 2
 1959–60, 1979–80
 FAI Cup: 2
 1970–71, 1981–82
 League of Ireland Cup: 3
 1975–76, 1992–93, 2001–02 
 League of Ireland First Division: 3 
 1991–92, 2012, 2016
 League of Ireland Shield: 2
 1953–54, 1983–84
 Dublin City Cup: 2
 1958–59, 1969–70
Munster Senior League: 1
 1985–86
 Munster Senior Cup: 13
 1937–38, 1948–49, 1953–54, 1958–59, 1962–63, 1976–77,1983–84, 1984–85, 1988–89, 1994–95, 2005–06, 2011–12, 2014–15

Notable former players

This list includes former Limerick FC players who had distinguished careers at both Limerick and other League of Ireland or British clubs, or who gained international honours with their country.

  Sam Allardyce
  Kenny Clements
  Johnny Matthews
  Gary Hulmes
  Billy Hamilton
  Tom Aherne
  Terry Conroy
  Peter Coyle
  Tim Cuneen
  Sean Cusack
  Eamon Deacy
  David Minihan
  Ken DeMange
  Al Finucane
  Johnny Gavin
  Tommy Gaynor
  Alfie Hale
  Eoin Hand
  Willie Hayes
  Rory Keane
  Des Kennedy
  Andy McEvoy
  Chiedozie Ogbene
  Turlough O'Connor
  Davy Walsh
  Johnny Walsh
  Tony Ward
  Brian Flynn
  Ally Dawson
  Ewan Fenton
  Willie Stevenson
  Timothy Faulth

Soccer Writers' Association of Ireland Awards

Personality of the Year

The Personality of the Year was first presented in 1961 and is the flagship award of the Soccer Writers' Association of Ireland (SWAI).

 Eoin Hand 1980
 Al Finucane 1967

Player of the Month

The SWAI Player of the Month Award has been in existence since 1971.

 Ian Turner – October 2015
 Vinny Faherty – August 2015
 Rory Gaffney – August 2014
 Ken DeMange – December 1992
 Billy Hamilton – September 1988
 Tommy Gaynor – March 1985
 Al Finucane – January 1985
 Liam Murphy – February 1984
 Des Kennedy – September 1980
 Brendan Storan – November 1979
 Eoin Hand – September 1979
 John Herrick – April 1977

Managers

Notable former managers

  Ewan Fenton (1960–67), (1970–72), (1975–76)
  Paddy Coad (1967–68)
  Eoin Hand (1979–83)
  Billy Hamilton (1987–89)
  Sam Allardyce (1991–92)
  Paul McGee (1 Feb 2007 – 31 Dec 2007)
  Neil McDonald (2017-2018)

References

External links

 The official Limerick FC website (archived 24 July 2019)
 Limerick FC Supporters' Club (last updated 2006)
 'Soccer' file at Limerick City Library, Ireland
 'Soccer Players' file at Limerick City Library, Ireland
 Limerick F.C. at Extra Time

 
Association football clubs established in 1937
Association football clubs disestablished in 2020
Association football clubs in County Limerick
1937 establishments in Ireland
2020 disestablishments in Ireland
Association football clubs in Limerick (city)
Defunct League of Ireland clubs
Former League of Ireland Premier Division clubs